The Bernhard Warkentin Homestead, also known as Little River Stock Farm or Warkentin Farm, is a historic farm complex on East North Street in Halstead, Kansas.  It was listed on the National Register of Historic Places in 1974.  It was further declared to be a National Historic Landmark in 1990, nationally significant for its association with Bernhard Warkentin, a pivotal figure in the development and wide cultivation of durum wheat in the country.

Description and history
The Warkentin Farm is located on the northern fringe of Halsted, on the east side of Main Street at East North Street. The farm complex is clustered near the western end of the property, with fields to the east. Buildings in the farmstead include the house, carriage house, barn, a silo, and a small pump house. The house is a -story wood-frame structure, built in 1884 to a design by Kansas architect John G. Haskell.

Bernhard Warkentin was a well-to-do Ukrainian immigrant of German extraction, who immigrated to the United States from Russia in 1872. In Russia he had been involved in the family business, the raising and milling of wheat. One of the major improvements in agriculture that Warkentin and the Mennonites brought with them were knowledge of Russian hard wheat varieties, which they brought over in the early years of the colonization. In 1896, Warkentin began working with Mark Carleton of the United States Department of Agriculture  to improve American knowledge of Russian wheat varieties, which eventually resulted in the hybridization experiments that produced durum wheat, one of the nation's leading wheat crops.

See also
List of National Historic Landmarks in Kansas
National Register of Historic Places listings in Harvey County, Kansas

References

National Historic Landmarks in Kansas
Houses on the National Register of Historic Places in Kansas
Houses in Harvey County, Kansas
Houses completed in 1874
National Register of Historic Places in Harvey County, Kansas